Vishnuvardhana is a 2011 Indian Kannada language comedy thriller film starring Sudeepa Bhavana Menon and Priyamani directed by P. Kumar, in his debut, and produced by Dwarakish. The film's music was composed by V. Harikrishna. The film was released on 8 December 2011. The film was officially remade in Bengali in 2014 as Bachchan. The movie was reported to have been inspired by the 2009 Korean movie Handphone. 5 years later, it was dubbed in Hindi as Mr. Mobile 2.

Plot 
Vishnuvardhana is the son of laundry owner Puttayya, who is a big fan of Dr.Vishnuvardhan and spends time with his astrologer friend Nimbehannu aka Shastri. He dreams of earning money and become rich in life, but not through hard work. One day, while delivering clothes to the colonel's house, He meets the colonel's daughter Bharathi and falls in love with her, but learns that she wants to marry a doctor and is set out to meet Dr.Suryaprakash. Vishnu and Shastri arrive at the Mallige Hospital where the meeting is to be held. He makes Bharathi fall for him by pretending to be a doctor.

Meanwhile, Vishnu gets into a tussle with a local goon, but the tussle is interrupted by Vishnu's constable uncle, who takes them to the police station where Vishnu learns that they work for a dreaded crime boss named Adishesha. Adishesha intervence, allowing the henchmen to leave and demands the identity of the person, but he lies to him that he left and withdrew the complaint. When Adishesha leaves, his Blackberry phone accidentally drops from his pocket where Vishnu retrieves it. After taking the phone, Adishesha's colleague Wahab tells Vishnu (assuming that Adishesha is talking) that the contract of killing a man named Gulchand at Mallige Hospital is done. Wahab ask about the location which he has to handover the money of  5 crores. Seizing the opportunity, Vishnu calls them to a nightclub where he gets the money and safely puts it in a bike locker.

A cat-mouse game between Adishesha (who finds that his phone is stolen by someone) and Vishnu in which Vishnu manages to hid his identity. Adishesha takes the help of an ACP to find the phone and the culprit who relucants, but agrees when Adishesha reveals about the secret video of ACP which he recorded on the phone. The ACP tries to catch Vishnu, but to no avail. Later, Vishnu and Shastri meets a girl named Meera, who knows about Vishnu and his game with Adishesha. Meera tells Vishnu that he should kill Adishesha within 24 hours or she will reveal his identity to Adishesha, to which he obliges. Meanwhile, Dr. Suryaprakash gives a contract to kill Vishnu as he ruined his meeting with Bharathi by pretending to be a doctor, to which he agrees. Later, Vishnu and Shastri decide to keep the phone secretly as the henchmen tried to attack his father where Vishnu learns about contract given by Suryaprakash to kill him. Vishnu meets Meera again in Adishesha's house, who is actually Adishesha's wife and gives him another 24 hours to finish him.

Vishnu reveals about his real identity to Bharathi and Colonel, who forgives him when Vishnu saved Bharathi's sister from a miscarriage. Vishnu pretends to know the culprit's face and stays in Adishesha's house. Vishnu confronts Meera to reveal the truth. Meera reveals that she loved Adishesha and left her family to be with him, but he cheated and drugged her with soporific as the ACP made a deal with Adishesha about his exoneration from the cases, in exchange for having sex with Meera. The ACP have sex with Meera, which is secretly recorded by Adishesha. When Meera witnessed Vishnu stealing Adishesha's phone, she decided to use Vishnu as a weapon to avenge her injustice. After learning her past, Vishnu obligies and decide to help her. He blackmails the ACP to kill Adishesha or the video will be telecasted in the news channels, The ACP tries to kill Adhishesha, but is thrashed by the former, who learnt his plan from the culprit (Vishnu himself) and tries to kill him, but gets a call from the phone booth's owner, revealing that the culprit was caught on the security camera's footage.

Adishesha, along with Vishnu and ACP finds Meera's face is caught in the footage and Adishesha leaves to confront Meera. After Adishesha and the ACP leave, Vishnu calls Meera and tells her to escape from the house. Meera escapes, but is caught by Adishesha and ask about the culprit, to which she denies telling him. Meera sees Vishnu amidst the crowd and screams not to arrive. While searching for the culprit (Vishnu). Vishnu reveals his identity to Adishesha and the two engage in hand-to-hand combat where Vishnu defeats and is about to kill him. The ACP having deduced Vishnu's identity forces him to hand over the phone, but Vishnu makes a deal with ACP to shoot Adishesha in exchange for the phone and a Mexican standoff ensues where Vishnu escapes from the standoff, whereas Adishesha and the ACP get killed. Thus, Vishnu reconciles with Shastri, thus ending all the troubles.

Cast
 Sudeepa as Vishnuvardhana
 Priyamani as Meera
 Sonu Sood as Adhishesha
 Bhavana as Bharathi
 Dwarakish as Colonel
 Arun Sagar as Nimbehannu aka Shastri
 J. Karthik as Dr. Surya Prakash
 Neenasam Ashwath as Adhishesha's brother
 Karisubbu as Puttayya, Laundry Owner & Vishnuvardhana's father
 Ravi Chethan as Police Inspector
Muni as District Commissioner of Police 
Taranga vishwa 
Ravi Varma 
Pon Kumaran as Vahaab in Special Appearance 
M. N. Suresh 
 Mandeep Rai as Blind Person & Telephone Booth Owner 
Mysore Ramanand as Marriage Broker

 Aarthi as Valli
 Sangeeta as Bharathi's sister

Reception

Critical response 

Shruti Indira Lakshminarayana from Rediff.com scored the film at 3.5 out of 5 stars and says "If you're looking for actor Vishnuvardhan's real-life story, you are not going to find much of it in this film. But if it's just some entertainment you have in mind, this will certainly do. Vishnuvardhana deserves a place on your weekend to-do list. Go for it". A critic from The New Indian Express wrote "And, he also deserves a lot of appreciation for his dancing skills. However, his performance in comedy sequences requires improvement. Arun Sagar, as an astrologer, complements Sudeep. ‘Jackie’-fame Bhavana puts in a lot of effort. To retain her glory but disappoints the audience. Her height is unsuitable for her to be cast opposite Sudeep". B S Srivani from Deccan Herald wrote "Sudeep though enjoys his role without any hang-ups - perhaps after S Narayan’s ‘Veera Parampare’. Sonu Sood is a treat to watch but for the wrong choice in dubbing. This Vishnuvardhana is a mood-lifter for sure". A critic from Bangalore Mirror wrote  "The title song may qualify with repeated hearings. Sudeep comes up with a sound performance and proves again that he is one of the best in the business. Bhavana and Priyamani fit the bill and the latter as the villain’s wife has a surprisingly different role. An enjoyable film that should mark the year-end with fireworks in Sandalwood".

Release and box office
The movie was released in around 140 theatres all over Karnataka. It was mostly the huge fan following of Vishnuvardhan who had watched the film initially, but was later followed by the Sudeepa fans and Vishnuvardhan fans together, pouring in to watch the film repeatedly. The film was later dubbed into Hindi as Mr. Mobile 2 by Goldmines Telefilms in 2016 with Sudeep's voice dubbed by Amar Babaria.

Title controversy
Since the movie went into production with the title Vishnuvardhana, there was a strong opposition against the usage of the title by some groups. This opposition was led by Dr. Vishnuvardhan's wife, actress Dr. Bharathi Vishnuvardhan. Dwarakish, along with his associate producer Yogish, struggled hard to fight the accusations. Finally, the title was changed to Veera Vishnuvardhana and was later changed again to Vishnuvardhana.

Remake
The movie was remade in Bengali as Bachchan starring Jeet, Aindrita Ray, Payel Sarkar, Kanchan Mullick and Mukul Dev in lead role.

Soundtrack

V. Harikrishna composed five songs along with the background score for this film. The audio was formally released on 1 December 2011 and on a private radio station, the songs were released on the same day. The lyrics are penned by lyricists such as Nagendra Prasad, Kaviraj and Yogaraj Bhat. Ashwini Media works took up the audio distribution rights for 3.6 million rupees.

Awards and nominations

59th Filmfare Awards South :-
Best Director – Kannada – Nominated – P. Kumar

1st South Indian International Movie Awards :-
Best Debut Director – Kannada – Winner – P. Kumar
Best Film – Kannada – Nominated – B.S. Dwarakish
Best Actor (Female) – Kannada – Nominated – Bhavana
Best Actor in a Supporting Role – Kannada – Nominated – Arun Sagar
Best Actor in a Negative Role – Kannada – Nominated – Sonu Sood
Best Cinematographer – Kannada – Nominated – Rajarathnam
Best Playback Singer (Female) – Kannada – Nominated – Sowmya Raoh for the song "Yedeyolage Guitaru"

4th Suvarna Film Awards :-
Best Actor – Winner – Sudeepa
Best Choreographer – Winner – Harsha

Sandalwood Star Awards :-
Best Film – Nominated
Best Actor – Nominated – Sudeepa
Best Director – Nominated – P. Kumar
Best Debut Director – Winner – P. Kumar
Best Comedian – Nominated – Arun Sagar
Best Actor in a Negative Role – Nominated – Sonu Sood
Best Screenplay – Nominated – P. Kumar
Best Supporting Actress – Winner – Priyamani
Best Dialogue – Nominated – Kalidasa, Srikanth, Ramesh Kamal
Best Stunt Director – Nominated – Ravi Varma, Ganesh 
Best Choreographer – Winner – Harsha
Best Art Director – Nominated – Mohan Pandit, Mohan Kere, Anand

Bangalore Times Film Awards :-
Best Actor – Winner – Sudeepa
Best Film – Nominated
Best Actor in a Negative Role Male – Nominated – Sonu Sood
Best Actor in a Negative Role Female – Nominated – Priyamani

1st Kannada International Music Awards (KiMA) :-
Best Playback Singer (Female) – Nominated – Lakshmi Vijay for the song "Yaarappana Gante Aagli"

References

External links
 
 

Films set in Bangalore
2011 films
Indian comedy thriller films
Kannada films remade in other languages
Films scored by V. Harikrishna
Indian films with live action and animation
2010s Kannada-language films
2011 directorial debut films
Films directed by Pon Kumaran